Cycle one of Suomen huippumalli haussa premiered on Sunday, 6 April 2008 from 20.00 to 21.00 on the Finnish channel Nelonen. The last episode aired on 8 June 2008. The winner for cycle one, Ani Alitalo, was awarded a €25,000 contract with Paparazzi Model Management, the front cover of Finnish Cosmopolitan and became a spokesperson for Max Factor.

Episode summaries

The First Steps Of Models In Training (Mallikokelaiden Ensiaskeleet)
Original airdate: 6 April 2008

The girls move into their new house and meet the judges. Saimi Hoyer gives a catwalk lesson and the girls' first challenge is a Vero Moda spring 2008 show. Tatjana, however, did not participate due to her mother's funeral. The first photo shoot is for the promo photos where the girls wear only a pair of jeans and shoes, causing insecurity in many of the girls. In judging, Ani and Maria are praised for their physique, while Tatjana and Anu gain praise for their intense eyes: meanwhile, Mariem is criticized for looking bored, Ana for not looking dignified, Daniela for looking lost, and Marje for having an intense gaze but looking a bit too pin-up-ish. In the end, Mariem is sent home due to the judges feeling she was too intimidated by the competition.

Bottom two: Daniela & Mariem
Eliminated: Mariem

Dolls Get Up To Speed (Nukkeneidit Vauhdissa)
Original airdate: 13 April 2008

The girls had their makeovers: many girls went through radical changes, and not all took them gracefully. Ana, whose hair was lightened from brunette to light brown and cut, felt her hair had been ruined and ended up crying over the change. Meanwhile, Manon complained that her new shorter haircut made her look too butch. After the makeovers, the girls had a makeup challenge to create a casting look in ten minutes. Anu won the challenge and chose Darina and Maria to go shopping with her while the other girls cleaned the house. The girls then had a photoshoot at the Helsinki Opera House, where they portrayed different dolls amongst the opera house mannequins. Each girl was given only twenty minutes to pose, adding the emphasis on being quick to take on a role.

Challenge winner: Anu Jussila

Several of the girls struggled with the challenge: Maria felt awkward due to her dress being several sizes too large, Darina disliked her outfit and had problems with producing the "doll-like" look in her eyes, and Tatjana became distracted by the stuffed magpie placed on her head. At panel, Manon was praised for her courage in front of the camera despite struggling somewhat, and both Daniela and Mari were applauded for their creativity on set. In the end, the bottom two were Darina for struggling with bringing a strong gaze to her picture, and Armi for failing to produce a photo that would have pleased the judges.

Bottom two: Armi & Darina Shved
Eliminated: Armi

Speed And Dangerous Situations (Vauhtia Ja Vaarallisia Tilanteita)
Original airdate: 20 April 2008

The girls are cheered up by two handsome young personal trainers coming to visit the house. Each girl gets some time with the trainers to talk about nutrition and fitness, and many of the girls are revealed to have rather unhealthy and irregular lifestyles. Another important guest came to dinner later on: long-term Finnish model Leena Sarvi advised the girls on how to behave in demanding company and situations. The challenge for this episode was a photo shoot on a trampoline. Each girl was asked to jump on the trampoline for ten minutes while simultaneously posing for the camera. Despite the difficulty of the task, most of the girls did well, but Marje and Ana were chosen to be the best and won a beauty spa treatment.

Challenge winners: Marje & Ana

The photoshoot for the episode was sporty: the girls were asked to pose for a catalogue while seated on a mountain bike suspended in the air on wires. Many girls struggled with the challenge, most of all Ana, whose fear of heights showed clearly in her pictures and caused her to burst into tears after her shoot was over. At judging, Darina and Daniela gained the most positive feedback for their pictures. The bottom two were Mari and Manon, and when Manon added fuel to the fire of the boredom visible in her pictures by saying she didn't want to be a top model even if the occasional photo shoot was fun, she was sent home by the judges much to her own relief.

Bottom two: Mari & Manon
Eliminated: Manon

Art And Creativity (Taidetta Ja Luovuutta)
Original airdate: 27 April 2008

The girls get creative and make dresses out of garbage bags, aluminum foil and duct tape while getting advice from judge Saimi Hoyer on editorial poses. British photographer John Lander shoots for a Cosmopolitan fashion shoot with the theme of modern art and the artist's muse. With the fashion editor, Darina, Ani, and Maria are chosen as the best and get to continue with more photographs.

Bottom two: Daniela & Tatjana
Eliminated: Daniela

Episode 5
Original airdate: 4 May 2008

"Glamorous on the red carpet". The girls get a surprise visit and runway walk lesson from a special guest judge Miss J. Alexander. Jaana Saarinen teaches the girls about improvisational acting. Anne Kukkohovi directs a beauty shoot, shot by fellow judge Sakari Majantie, giving the models a specific characteristic to express. Ofer Amir photographs the girls for a Bonaqua ad campaign.

Bottom two: Marje & Tatjana
Eliminated: Tatjana

Episode 6
Original airdate: 11 May 2008

"Girls on film". The girls do a commercial for Magnum ice cream, directed by Miikka Lommi. After getting their picture portfolios at Paparazzi Modeling Agency, the girls go to Stockholm, Sweden for casting tests.

Bottom two: Mari & Marje
Eliminated: Marje

Episode 7
Original airdate: 18 May 2008

"On the tundra in bikinis". The girls fly north to Ylläs in Lapland where they face numerous challenges dealing with perseverance. The first challenge is a photo shoot in a sauna on a ski lift in pairs, showing that each girl can work well with others.

Challenge winners: Ani Alitalo & Darina Shved

Next, is the photo shoot for judging: posing as a Lapland witch in a reindeer skin bikini with a husky. The last challenge is a runway show on the snow wearing Lapland designs. Both Ana’s and Mari’s photos were a disappointment and because of Ana’s complaints about her fears and Mari’s inability to cooperate, both girls are sent home.

Bottom two: Ana & Mari
Eliminated: Ana & Mari

Episode 8
Original airdate: 25 May 2008

"Attractive". The girls get a lesson in pole dancing. Darina wins the challenge and chooses Mari to share her prize: mountain bikes from Hobby Hall.

Challenge winner: Darina Shved

The girls are then sent to be in ex-model Kim Herold's first music video Social Butterfly. Next, the girls are photographed as 50s Hollywood film stars, where the goal is to portray attractiveness.

Bottom two: Anu Jussila & Darina Shved
Eliminated: Anu Jussila

Episode 9
Original airdate: 1 June 2008

The top three head to Turkey where they meet Tommy Kilponen, from Sillä silmällä, the Finnish version of Queer Eye For the Straight Guy. They must go to a local bazaar to find  for the first photo shoot on the beach. In the second photo shoot, directed by Anne Kukkohovi, the girls portrayed Greek goddesses. The last one was a swimsuit photo shoot. All photography was shot by Sakari Majantie.

Bottom two: Ani Alitalo & Maria Rytkönen
Eliminated: Maria Rytkönen

Episode 10
Original airdate: 8 June 2008

Still in Turkey, Sakari Majantie photographs the two finalists at the hotel pool. The challenge is to show that they can work in an environment with background distractions. Back in Finland, Paparazzi Modelling Agency conducts interviews with the finalists. The final photo shoot with Max Factor helps in determining the winner of the competition.

Final two: Ani Alitalo & Darina Shved
Finland's Next Top Model: Ani Alitalo

Contestants
(ages are stated at start of contest)

Summaries

Call-out order

 The contestant was eliminated
 The contestant won the competition

Photo shoot guide
Episode 1 photo shoot: Promo photos
Episode 2 photo shoot: Helsinki opera house dolls
Episode 3 photo shoot: Hobby Hall catalogue and expressive photos
Episode 4 photo shoot: Cosmopolitan editorial fashion  
Episode 5 photo shoots: Emotion beauty shots; Bonaqua campaign 
Episode 6 commercial: Magnum ice cream
Episode 7 photo shoot: Lapland witches
Episode 8 photo shoot: B&W film noir 
Episode 9 photo shoots: Beach & body control; Greek goddesses; swimsuit photos 
Episode 10 photo shoots: Poolside photos; Max Factor

References

External links
Nelonen homepage (in Finnish)
Nelonen homepage (in English)
Suomen huippumalli haussa homepage

Suomen huippumalli haussa
2008 Finnish television seasons

fi:Suomen huippumalli haussa